Good Spirit Lake Provincial Park is a provincial park on the eastern side of the Canadian province of Saskatchewan. Founded in 1931, the park surrounds the western and southern shores of Good Spirit Lake and is one of Saskatchewan's six founding provincial parks. Highway 47 runs along the western boundary and Highway 229 provides access to the park's amenities.

Attractions and activities at the park include campgrounds, picnicking, boating, swimming, and hiking through sand dunes. Two kilometres south of the park at Good Spirit Acres is Good Spirit Golf Resort.

Attractions and amenities 
There are three campgrounds with over 200 sites in Good Spirit Lake Provincial Park. Every campsite at Balsam Campground has electrical hookups while Sandy Ridge and Aspen Campgrounds have a mix of electric and non-electric sites. Facilities at the campground include potable water, laundry, a sani-dump, convenience store, playground, boat launch, mini-golf, and showers and washrooms. Other facilities include a cottage subdivision called Donald Gunn Subdivision and Good Spirit Bible Camp.

In 2004, Good Spirit Lake Beach was named by Maclean's Magazine as one of Canada's top 10 beaches for its shallow waters and natural sand. Kitchimanitou and Good Spirit Beaches are located by the campground on the south-western shore of the lake. Sandy Beach is located on the south-eastern shore of the lake at the park boundary, just south of Burgis Beach.

Dunes and trails 
At the southern end of the park and lake are naturally formed sand dunes that rise up to five storeys. The dunes and the sandy lake bottom were formed near the end of the last ice age when a river ran through the area and deposited the sands. Several trails totalling  traverse the park and the dunes, including a section of the Trans Canada Trail.

In the winter season, 18 kilometres of the trails are groomed for cross-country skiing and snowmobiling.

Fishing 
There is no designated fishing pier and the shores around the lake are shallow and sandy; the best fishing is by boat. There is a boat launch in the park and several others around the lake. Fish commonly found in the lake include northern pike, perch, and walleye.

See also 
List of protected areas of Saskatchewan
Tourism in Saskatchewan

References 

Provincial parks of Saskatchewan
Good Lake No. 274, Saskatchewan